Gotthard Friedrich Stender ( or Ģederts Fridriks Štenders; 1714–1796), also called Old Stender (Vecais Stenders), was a Baltic German Lutheran parson who played an outstanding role in Latvia's history of culture. He was the first Latvian grammarian and lexicographer, founder of the Latvian secular literature in the 18th century. In the spirit of Enlightenment, he wrote the first Latvian-German and German-Latvian dictionaries, wrote the first encyclopedia “” (1774), and wrote the first illustrated Latvian alphabet book (1787).

Biography 

His grandfather was also a parson in the Selonia region of Duchy of Courland. He got his first education from his father, but later studied in Subate German school where one of his main interests was Latin. From 1736 until 1739, Stender studied theology, rhetoric and ancient languages in universities of Jena and Halle. Upon returning to Courland he worked as a private tutor in Lielbērstele, a teacher in Jelgava and from 1744 a Lutheran parson in Linde-Birzgale and later Žeimelis parish.

In 1759, together with his family, Stender relocated to Königslutter in Duchy of Brunswick-Lüneburg, where he worked as a rector for a local school, but a few months later after a conflict with a local clergyman, they moved to Copenhagen, where he worked as a geography teacher at a cadet school. There, using an innovative approach he made a globe for King of Denmark Frederik V. Stender also became interested in ideas of Freemasonry and became a member of a lodge.

In 1765, Stender returned to Duchy of Courland and Semigallia. For the rest of his life, he served as a parson in the Sēlpils and Sunākste parishes. Gotthard Friedrich Stender died in his home in Sunākste, 17 May 1796. His son , grandson  and great-grandson  were all Lutheran parsons as well.

Works 

Stender produced didactic tales and idyllic poems meant to educate and uplift the Latvian peasants who were oppressed by serfdom. He wrote secular poetry ranging from philosophical odes to the grandeur of nature to unpretentious, folksy songs, which widely influenced the literary taste of the nation, and won extreme popularity. His works, although written in a simple language and style, meant for the barely educated 18th century Latvians, promoted education in Latvian schools throughout the whole 19th century. His Latvian grammar book and a dictionary was used not only by Latvians and Baltic Germans, but also by foreign linguists from all over Europe. Stender, along with Johann Gottfried Herder, was the first author who analysed dainas, riddles, proverbs and sayings.

Commemoration 

In 2014, on the 300th anniversary of Gotthard Friedrich Stender's birthday, the Bank of Latvia released a euro silver commemorative coin dedicated to Stender.

References

External links
 

1714 births
1796 deaths
People from Ilūkste Municipality
People from the Duchy of Courland and Semigallia
Baltic-German people
Latvian writers
Latvian Lutherans
Latvian inventors
Latvian folk music
Age of Enlightenment
Freemasons